The 2015 Cincinnati Bengals season was the franchise's 46th season in the National Football League, the 48th overall and the thirteenth under head coach Marvin Lewis.

The Cincinnati Bengals got off to a franchise best start after beating the Pittsburgh Steelers at Heinz Field by a score of 16–10, improving them to 7–0. Their winning streak ended in Week 10 with a loss to the Houston Texans in Cincinnati.  Later in the season, they clinched a playoff spot for a franchise record fifth straight year. They clinched their second AFC North title in the last three seasons with their Week 16 loss at the Denver Broncos because of the Steelers loss to the Ravens the day before. They lost to the Steelers in the Wild Card 16–18 in what is considered one of the biggest meltdowns in Bengals history. This marked the 25th consecutive season without a playoff win for the Bengals. They also became the first team in NFL history to lose five consecutive playoff games in the first round.

2015 was the Bengals final playoff appearance in the Marvin Lewis era, as they entered a period of decline afterwards. They did not return to the postseason nor had a winning record until 2021, where they reached Super Bowl LVI, although they lost to the Los Angeles Rams.

2015 draft class

Staff

Final roster

Schedule

Preseason

Regular season

Note: Intra-division opponents are in bold text.

Postseason

Game summaries

Regular season

Week 1: at Oakland Raiders

The Bengals started their season on the road against the Raiders. They would score first when Jeremy Hill ran for a TD from 3 yards out 7-0 lead in the first quarter for that quarter's only score.  They increase their lead in the second quarter when Mike Nugent nailed a 32-yard field goal for a 10-0 lead followed up by Hill running for a 2-yard TD for a 17-0 lead followed up by Andy Dalton finding Tyler Eifert on a 13-yard TD pass for a 24-0 lead at halftime.  After the break, the Bengals went back to work as Dalton and Eifert hooked up again this time on an 8-yard TD pass (with a failed PAT) for a 30-0 lead.  Nugent put a 35-yard field goal through for a 33-0 lead.  In the fourth quarter, it was all Raiders when Backup QB Matt McGloin found Marcel Reese on 2 straight TD passes: from 11 and 9 yards out (with a failed 2-point conversion) for a final score of 33-13.

With the win, the Bengals started their season 1–0. This was the Bengals' first win against the Raiders in Oakland, improving their record at Oakland to 1–10.

Week 2: vs. San Diego Chargers

The Bengals' home opener was against the Chargers.  In the first quarter, Andy Dalton found A. J. Green on a 16-yard pass for a 7-0 lead.  The Chargers would later on score when Josh Lambo kicked a 40-yard field goal for a 7-3 game.  They drew closer in the second quarter, when Lambo kicked another field goal from 32 yards out for a 7-6 game.  The Bengals moved ahead by 8 when Andy Dalton found Marvin Jones on a 45-yard pass for a 14-6 game at halftime.  In the third quarter, the Chargers once again came within a point when Philip Rivers found Stevie Johnson on a 10-yard pass for a 14-13 game.  The Bengals pulled ahead by 4 when Mike Nugent kicked a 21-yard field goal for a 17-13 game.  In the fourth quarter, Dalton found Tyler Eifert on a 9-yard pass for a 24-13 lead.  The Chargers would come within 5 as Rivers found Malcolm Floyd on a 40-yard pass for a 24-19 game.  After pressuring the Bengals' offense, the Chargers got the ball back.  Though one of Rivers's comeback passes was picked off sealing the win for the Bengals.

With the win, the Bengals improved to 2-0.

Week 3: at Baltimore Ravens

After a tough win at home over the Chargers, the Bengals traveled to Baltimore to take on the winless Ravens.  The first half was all Bengals: they scored in the first quarter as Andy Dalton ran for a 7-yard TD for a 7-0 lead and followed up in the second quarter when Dalton found Marvin Jones on a 16-yard TD pass for a 14-0 lead at halftime.  The Ravens were able to get on the board in the third quarter when Joe Flacco found Steve Smith Sr. on a 50-yard TD pass for a 14-7 game and the only score of the period.  In the fourth quarter, the Ravens took the lead at first coming within 4 when Justin Tucker put a 21-yard field goal through for a 14-10 game and then when C. J. Mosley returned a fumble 41 yards for a TD for a 17-14 lead.  The Bengals retook the lead when Dalton found A. J. Green on an 80-yard TD pass for a 21-17 game before the Ravens went back into the lead when Flacco found Smith Sr. again this time on a 16-yard TD pass for a 24-21 game.  Dalton and Green hooked up on the last score of the game:  a 7-yard TD pass for the final score of 28-24.

With their 4th straight win over the Ravens, the Bengals improved to 3-0 for the 2nd straight season, and captured their 4th 3-0 start under Marvin Lewis. This was also their first ever 2 game winning streak in Baltimore.

Week 4: vs. Kansas City Chiefs

After a tough win over the Ravens, the Bengals returned home for a game against the Chiefs.  They would score first in the first quarter when Jeremy Hill ran for an 8-yard TD for a 7-0 lead.  Cairo Santos then put a 22-yard field goal through to give the Chiefs their first score of the game 7-3.  The Bengals moved ahead by 11 when Giovani Bernard ran for a 13-yard TD for a 14-3 game.
In the second quarter, it was all Chiefs as Santos nailed 3 straight field goals eventually to get within 2 points before halftime:  from 40, 51, and 34 yards out for 14-6, 14-9, and the 14-12 score at halftime.  The Bengals however got back to work in the third quarter when Andy Dalton found Brandon Tate on a 55-yard TD pass increasing their lead to 21-12.  The Chiefs came within 6 as Santos put a 40-yard field goal through for a 21-15 game.  The Bengals moved ahead by 14 when Hill ran for a 5-yard TD (with a successful 2-point conversion) for a 29-15 game.  In the fourth quarter, the Chiefs moved within 11 as Santos put a 29-yard field goal through for a 29-18 game.  The Bengals would pretty much seal the game when Hill ran for a 1-yard TD for a 36-18 game.  The Chiefs wrapped up the scoring of the game when Santos kicked yet another 51-yard field goal for the eventual final score of 36-21.

With the win, the Bengals improved to 4-0, their first such start since 2005. The defense also didn't allow a single touchdown (just 7 field goals). They also won their 5th straight home game against the Chiefs.

Week 5: vs. Seattle Seahawks

The Bengals returned home to take on the Seahawks.  They would score first in the first quarter when Andy Dalton found Tyler Eifert on a 14-yard TD pass for a 7-0.  The Seahawks scored 24 straight points: later on in the quarter they managed to tie it up when Russel Wilson found Jermaine Kearse on a 30-yard TD pass for a 7-7 game.
In the second quarter, the Seahawks took the lead as Steven Hauschka nailed a 24-yard field goal for a 10-7 game at halftime.  In the third quarter, the Seahawks went back to work as Thomas Rawls ran for a 69-yard TD for a 17-7 game followed up by Bobby Wagner returning a fumble 23 yards for a TD for a 24-7 game.  In the fourth quarter, the Bengals would start a reign of 20 straight points:  First starting out when Dalton and Eifert hooked up again on a 10-yard TD pass for a 24-14 game followed by Dalton running for a 5-yard TD for a 24-21 game.  Mike Nugent then kicked a 31-yard field goal through for a tied game at 24-24.  In overtime, Nugent would kick the game winning 42-yard field goal for the 27-24 win.

With the win, the Bengals improved to 5-0 for the first time since 1988.

This win also tied the 3rd largest comeback win in franchise history. It was also the first time the Seahawks had blown a 17-point 4th quarter lead since 2004 against St. Louis.

Week 6: at Buffalo Bills

With the win, the Bengals improved to 6-0, their first such start since 1988 which would also see them on a 6-game winning streak.  This would be their third 6-0 start in franchise history.

Week 8: at Pittsburgh Steelers

Despite the return of Ben Roethlisberger, the Bengals managed to come from behind and win the game 16-10 and achieve a mark of 7-0 for the first time in franchise history.

Week 9: vs. Cleveland Browns

The Bengals defeated the Johnny Manziel-led Browns and improved to a franchise-best 8–0 on the season. Tight end Tyler Eifert caught three touchdown passes from Andy Dalton in the game, as he tied the team record for TDs in a season by a TE (9).

Week 10: vs. Houston Texans

The Bengals looked to remain undefeated as they hosted J. J. Watt and the Houston Texans. The Texans' starting quarterback, Brian Hoyer, left the game with a concussion, but recently signed backup T. J. Yates threw a fourth-quarter touchdown pass to DeAndre Hopkins. Andy Dalton drove the Bengals into Texans territory, but A. J. Green fumbled, sealing the Texans' 10-6 victory over the Bengals.

With the loss, the Bengals dropped to 8-1, and were no longer undefeated, leaving the New England Patriots as the only unbeaten team in the AFC at that point.

Week 11: at Arizona Cardinals

The 8-1 Bengals traveled to Arizona to face the 7-2 Cardinals and former Bengals #1 overall draft pick Carson Palmer.

In the first quarter, the Bengals would strike first as Dalton found Tyler Eifert on a 3-yard touchdown pass to give them a 7-0 lead for the only score of the period. In the second quarter, the Cardinals would tie the game when Palmer found Darren Fells from 18 yards out to tie things up at 7. The Bengals would retake the lead as Jeremy Hill ran into the end zone from 2 yards out to give them a 14-7 lead at halftime. In the 3rd quarter, it was all Cardinals, as Carson Palmer found J.J Nelson for a 64-yard touchdown to tie the game at 14. Arizona would take their first lead of the game as Palmer found John Brown from 18 yards out to give them a 21-14 lead. The Cardinals would extend the lead as Palmer found David Johnson from 16 yards out to extend the lead to 28-14.  In the fourth quarter, the Bengals would cut into the lead as Hill ran in his second touchdown of the night, this one from 1 yard out, to cut the deficit to 28-21. After a Dalton fumble, Chandler Catanzaro would extend the Arizona lead to 31-21. However, the Bengals would make the game close once again, as Eifert caught his second touchdown of the night, cutting the lead to 31-28. Cincinnati would tie the game 31-31 on a Mike Nugent field goal. However, Palmer and the Cardinals offense went right down the field to get into the field goal range. The most notable part of this drive, and, perhaps, the game, was an unsportsmanlike conduct penalty by Bengals defensive tackle Domata Peko. The penalty was for mimicking the count during the huddle. The penalty made the field goal easier, and Catanzaro nailed the game winner from 32 yards out as time expired to end the game.

With the loss, the Bengals fell to 8-2. The loss also dropped them to 0-4 all time against the Cardinals on the road, and 0-3 all time against them in Arizona.

Week 12: vs. St. Louis Rams

In Week 12, the Bengals looked to bounce back from two straight losses after starting 8–0. Rams quarterback Nick Foles threw 3 Interceptions and the Bengals routed the Rams in Cincinnati, 31–7, to move to 9–2. With a Pittsburgh to loss to Seattle later that evening, the Bengals re-gained a 3-game lead in the AFC North Division.

Week 13: at Cleveland Browns

With the convincing road win, the Bengals improved to 10–2 on the season, sweeping the Browns for the first time since 2011. This was also their largest win in the Bengals-Browns series.

Week 14: vs. Pittsburgh Steelers

Not only did the Bengals lose 33-20 and drop to 10-3, but lost quarterback Andy Dalton to a broken thumb in the first quarter. He missed the rest of the season and his loss shattered the Bengals' Super Bowl hopes. Second year quarterback A. J. McCarron took over for the game's remainder. Along with Dalton, Tyler Eifert, who returned from a stinger, left the game with a concussion.

Week 15: at San Francisco 49ers

This was A. J. McCarron's first game as starting quarterback, and the Bengals' first win at San Francisco since 1974.

With the win, the Bengals improved to 11-3. However, due to Pittsburgh beating Denver, they were unable to clinch the AFC North.

Week 16: at Denver Broncos

Due to the Steelers' loss to the Ravens the previous day, the Bengals entered the game as the AFC North champions. The Bengals rushed out to a 14–0 lead in the first half on a McCarron touchdown pass and a Mohamed Sanu rush, but Denver cut the deficit to 11 points as Brandon McManus nailed a short 23-yard field goal with just 18 seconds remaining before halftime. In the second half, momentum shifted mightily after a missed field goal by Mike Nugent in the third. Emmanuel Sanders hauled in an 8-yard pass from Brock Osweiler to cut the deficit to 14–10, and Denver claimed the lead for the first time in the game on a 39-yard touchdown run by C. J. Anderson with 11:17 remaining in the 4th Quarter. The Bengals marched down the field to tie the game on Mike Nugent's season-long 52-yard field goal, making the score 17–17 at the end of regulation. The tired Bengals failed to put any  points on the board in the extra period, allowing a 37-yard McManus field goal to make the score 20–17 Denver. A botched snap on the ensuing Bengals drive was recovered by the Broncos, ending the game and Cincinnati's hopes for a first-round bye in the playoffs. With the loss, the Bengals fell to 11–4 on the season.

Despite losing, the Bengals were able to clinch the AFC North with the Steelers' loss to the Ravens, as stated before.

The loss was also the 10th straight in Denver for the Bengals, dating back to 1975.

Week 17: vs. Baltimore Ravens

Cincinnati returned home to Paul Brown Stadium to face the AFC North rival Baltimore Ravens in the final game of the NFL regular season. After offensive struggles by both teams during the opening quarter, the Ravens got on the board with a 28-yard field goal by Justin Tucker. Later on in the quarter, Tucker would add three more with another field goal, this time from 50 yards out. With 1:56 remaining in the first half, Tyler Eifert, back after missing two games due to injury, caught a 22-yard pass from McCarron as the Bengals took the lead, 7–6. Baltimore would later retake the lead, 9–7, as time expired in the half with a third Tucker field goal from 49 yards. Cincinnati came out strong in the second half, scoring 17 unanswered points en route to the 24–16 victory. 57,254 were in attendance, the smallest crowd at Paul Brown Stadium of the season.

With the win, the Bengals finished the season tying their franchise-best record in a 16-game season at 12-4.  However, the Broncos' win over the Chargers later on in the day gave the Bengals the #3 seed in the postseason.

Postseason

AFC Wild Card Playoffs: vs. (6) Pittsburgh Steelers

The Steelers put up a 15–0 lead before the Bengals scored 16 unanswered in the fourth quarter to lead it 16–15. The Steelers drove down the field when a series of penalties taken by Adam Jones and Vontaze Burfict put them into field goal range late in the game, and Chris Boswell kicked the winning field goal to make it 18–16. A. J. McCarron tried to go for a miracle with 0:06 left in the game, but it fell incomplete, leading to the Bengals being one-and-done for the fifth season in a row and dropping their overall record to 12–5.

The Bengals are the first team to go to the playoffs for 5 consecutive seasons and be one-and-done in all of them.

The team also dropped to 0–2 against the Steelers in the postseason and 0–7 under Marvin Lewis in the postseason. This would prove the Bengals’ last playoff appearance in his tenure, as his contract would not be renewed after the 2018 season.

Standings

Division

Conference

References

External links
 

Cincinnati
Cincinnati Bengals seasons
AFC North championship seasons
Cincinnati Bengals